Harrogate railway station serves the town of Harrogate in North Yorkshire, England. Northern Trains operate the station and provide local passenger train services, with a London North Eastern Railway service to and from London King's Cross running six times per day.

History
The station was opened by the North Eastern Railway on 1 August 1862. It was designed by the architect Thomas Prosser and was the first building in Harrogate built of brick and had two platforms. Once the individual companies had become part of the NER, the company concentrated all lines at a new single depot.

A storm in November 1866 caused a chimney stack to fall through the station roof  causing considerable damage. In 1873, a footbridge was added.

The booking office was robbed on 7 December 1868 when thieves drilled through the ticket window covering with a bit and brace, and stole a small amount of cash.

The station platforms were lengthened by 100 yards in 1883, largely as a result of the opening of a second route to Leeds via  (the Cross Gates to Wetherby Line) in 1876.

In 1892, the actor, Harry Fischer, was shot at by Violet Gordon at the station. She missed and was arrested by the police.

The station was largely demolished in 1964/65 and replaced with a more utilitarian one (with fewer platforms) by Taylor Bown and Miller, Architects (Harrogate). A car park now occupies the site of the former bay platforms on the south side. It coincided with the loss of three of the main routes through the town in the Beeching Axe – both routes via Wetherby closed to passenger traffic on 6 January 1964 and the Leeds Northern route to  via  on 6 March 1967.

The York branch was included in Beeching's 1963 report, but it was reprieved in 1966 and remains open. The original, attractive wrought iron footbridge remained until the mid 2000s when it was taken down and replaced by a modern plain steel one further down the platform. The station was serviced by a cafe called the 'Circle Bar' until its closure in the 1990s.

Station Masters

Charles Matthews ca. 1862 – 1874
James Richardson 1874 – 1899
Francis Purvis 1899 – 1921
William Parker 1922 – 1927 (formerly station master at Durham)
James K. Shaw 1927 – 1934 (formerly station master at Penistone)
James Craig 1934 – 1936 (afterwards station master at Glasgow Queen Street)
R. A. Dawes 1936 – 1940 (formerly station master at Wakefield Westgate)
T. Arnott 1940 (afterwards station master at Selby)
Albert Ernest Purnell 1941 – 1943 (formerly station master at Bridlington)
J. A. Wilson 1943 – 1950 (formerly station master at Northallerton)
W. J. Thomas 1950 – 1952
R. B. King 1961 – ???? (formerly station master at Ripon)
Frederick Longbottom ???? – 1963
R. W. Irving 1963 – ???? (formerly station manager at Saltburn)

Facilities

The station has a staffed ticket office open seven days a week (except late evenings), along with ticket machines. Facilities include a newsagent, key cutters, ATMs, a cafe, photo booths and a waiting room, all located on the main concourse on Platform 1. The station has three platforms, but only platforms 1 and 3 are in operation – platform 2 (an east-facing bay) is not in public use. Full step-free access is available to both main platforms and they are linked by a footbridge with lifts. Ticket barriers were installed in early 2017.

Services
The Monday to Sunday service is generally 2tph to Leeds (southbound); and 2tph to York

Services increase in frequency at peak time to Leeds, resulting in 3tph (trains per hour).

Late evenings an hourly service operates between Leeds, Harrogate and York.

London North Eastern Railway operates six daily services to and from London King's Cross on Mondays to Saturdays. These trains also provide a third hourly clockface service to Leeds every two hours.

Harrogate (Brunswick) station

Harrogate's first railway station, Brunswick, was the terminus of York and North Midland Railway's branch line and the first train arrived there on 20 July 1848. The station was situated on the site where Trinity Methodist Church now stands, close to the Prince of Wales roundabout and some distance from either High or Low Harrogate. When the new line of the North Eastern Railway entered Harrogate via a cutting through The Stray, Brunswick closed and the first train into the town centre station was on 1 August 1862.

Ripon Railway

The town was previously served by a railway, the Leeds-Northallerton Line that ran between Leeds and Northallerton via this station and Ripon. It was once part of the North Eastern Railway and then LNER. The site is now occupied by Starbeck railway station.

The Ripon Line was closed to passengers on 6 March 1967 and to freight on 5 September 1969 as part of the wider Beeching Axe, despite a vigorous campaign by local campaigners, including the city's MP. Today much of the route of the line through the city is now a relief road and although the former station still stands, it is now surrounded by a new housing development. The issue remains a significant one in local politics and there are movements wanting to restore the line. Reports suggest the reopening of a line between Ripon and Harrogate railway station would be economically viable, costing £40 million and could initially attract 1,200 passengers a day, rising to 2,700. Campaigners call on MPs to restore Ripon railway link.

References

External links

Railway stations in Harrogate
DfT Category C1 stations
Former North Eastern Railway (UK) stations
Railway stations in Great Britain opened in 1862
Northern franchise railway stations
Railway stations served by London North Eastern Railway
1862 establishments in England
Thomas Prosser railway stations